Chester Anton Chesney (March 9, 1916 – September 20, 1986) was a U.S. Representative from Illinois.

Early life and education
Chester A. Chesney was born in Chicago, Illinois, of Polish descent. He attended St. Hyacinth and Lane Technical High School. He graduated from the DePaul University, Chicago, Illinois, in 1938.

Early career
Chesney later played professional football with the Chicago Bears in 1939 and 1940.

He entered the United States Air Force in June 1941 as a private and was discharged as a major in 1946 with service in the Pacific and European Theaters. He served as assistant chief of special service, Veterans Administration, Hines, Illinois, in 1946 and 1947.

After the war, he took graduate work at Northwestern University Graduate Commerce School in 1947. He became an Executive with Montgomery Ward & Co., in 1948 and 1949. He later served as vice-president and director of Avondale Savings & Loan Association.

Political career
Chesney was elected as a Democrat to the Eighty-first Congress (January 3, 1949 – January 3, 1951). He was an unsuccessful candidate for reelection in 1950 to the Eighty-second Congress, though served as delegate to the 1968 Democratic National Convention.

Personal life

He was a resident of Marco Island, Florida, until his death there September 20, 1986. He was interred in St. Adalbert Cemetery, Niles, Illinois.

References

External links

1916 births
1986 deaths
American athlete-politicians
Politicians from Chicago
United States Army Air Forces officers
Chicago Bears players
American politicians of Polish descent
20th-century American politicians
People from Marco Island, Florida
Democratic Party members of the United States House of Representatives from Illinois
United States Army Air Forces personnel of World War II
Military personnel from Illinois